The United Cyprus Party (Turkish: Birleşik Kıbrıs Partisi, BKP) is a left-wing, socialist party in Northern Cyprus. The party was founded in 2003 by İzzet İzcan. It supports the idea of a free, demilitarised and united Cyprus. In the 2009 elections, the BKP won 34,239 votes (2.42%) and no seats. In the 2013 elections it won 39,127 votes (3.15%) and no seats.

References

External links
Official web site

Cypriot nationalism
2003 establishments in Northern Cyprus
Party of the European Left observer parties
Political parties established in 2003
Political parties in Northern Cyprus
Socialist parties in Cyprus